Cryptolechia rigidellum is a moth in the family Depressariidae. It was described by Pierre Chrétien in 1915. It is found in Algeria.

References

Moths described in 1915
Cryptolechia (moth)